Vasilyevskoye is a rural locality (a village) in Ugolskoye Rural Settlement, Sheksninsky District, Vologda Oblast, Russia. The population was 17 as of 2002.

Geography 
Vasilyevskoye is located 18 km southeast of Sheksna (the district's administrative centre) by road. Suslovskoye is the nearest rural locality.

References 

Rural localities in Sheksninsky District